Ehsan Abdi (born 26 June 1986) is an Iranian footballer who plays as a defensive midfielder. He started his career with Nassaji Mazandaran.

Club career

Nassaji Mazandaran
Ehsan started his debut against Parseh Tehran with a 1–1 draw. After weeks he was used as a starting 11 and played with his best.

Naft Masjed Soleyman
Ehsan started his debut a 0–2 defeat against Esteghlal, he got subbed in for Milad Zeneyedpour in 84th minute but failed to keep a goal away from Esteghlal.

References
 

Living people
Iranian footballers
1986 births
Association football midfielders
Nassaji Mazandaran players
Naft Masjed Soleyman F.C. players
Sanat Mes Kerman F.C. players